The Sheepskin Trail is a non-motorized rail-trail in Fayette County, Pennsylvania. It is planned to eventually link the Great Allegheny Passage trail system near Dunbar to the Mon River Trail system at the Pennsylvania/West Virginia state line near Point Marion.

History and Future

History 
In 1997, a feasibility study was completed and in 2007, the former Baltimore and Ohio Railroad line was purchased and Phase 1, which cost $647,927, was opened in May 2008.

Future 
Plans are still being worked out at this time to construct the trail further towards Uniontown, the county seat, and then further to Point Marion, as funding becomes available.

References 

Rail trails in Pennsylvania
Protected areas of Fayette County, Pennsylvania
2008 establishments in Pennsylvania